Bruce Paul Abbott (born July 28, 1954) is an American film, stage, and television actor. Originally beginning his career in theater, Abbott later gained notoriety for his role as Dan Cain in the cult sci-fi horror films Re-Animator (1985)<ref name= "Maslin">{{cite web | author=Maslin, Janet | authorlink= Janet Maslin | title =Re Animator (1985) SCREEN: STUART GORDON DIRECTS 'RE-ANIMATOR | work= The New York Times |date = October 18, 1985 | url = https://movies.nytimes.com/movie/review?_r=1&res=9E04EED91E39F93BA25753C1A963948260}}</ref> and Bride of Re-Animator (1990). 

He has also had roles in the horror films Bad Dreams (1988) and The Prophecy II (1996), as well as the sci-fi film Out of Time. From 1992 to 1993, he portrayed Judge Nicholas Marshall on the television series Dark Justice.

Early life
Abbott was born and raised in Portland, Oregon, where he graduated from David Douglas High School in 1972. His career began as a dancer and actor in the Oregon Shakespeare Festival in Ashland, Oregon, where he spent three seasons from 1975 to 1978, appearing in productions of A Winter's Tale, All's Well That Ends Well, Henry VI Part 2, The Tempest, and The Tragedy of King Richard III.

He attended Portland State University, and later the American Conservatory Theater in San Francisco, California.

Career
In 1980, Abbott relocated from Portland to Hollywood ("in the middle of the actors' strike, and I didn't know anyone," he recalled). Shortly afterwards, he was cast as the villain in the movie Tag: The Assassination Game. He met his future (first) wife Linda Hamilton on the set. In 1985, he starred as medical student Dan Cain in Stuart Gordon's sci-fi horror film Re-Animator (1985), a role he reprised in the sequel Bride of Re-Animator (1990). He later starred in Summer Heat (1987), a period drama, with Lori Singer and Kathy Bates. He also starred in the horror film Bad Dreams (1988) directed by Andrew Fleming, and the comedy Casual Sex? (1989). Abbott had a lead role in the futuristic television film Out of Time (1988), with Bill Maher.

In 1991, he appeared as Harry Pierpont in the television film Dillinger, with Sherilyn Fenn and Patricia Arquette. From 1992 to 1993, he appeared in a recurring role as Judge Nicholas Marshall in the series Dark Justice.

Throughout his career, Abbott has been a guest star on many TV series, including Murder, She Wrote, Family Law, Diagnosis: Murder, and more. He had a recurring role in the short-lived series The Net, based on the film of the same title starring Sandra Bullock. He appeared in the horror sequel The Prophecy II (1996), with Christopher Walken and Brittany Murphy.

Abbott is semi-retired from acting. He is an architect and artist and works in the custom-design industry. He has designed more than 20 homes.

Personal life
Abbott married Linda Hamilton in 1982; the union produced one child, Dalton Abbott (born October 4, 1989) (who can be seen in Terminator 2: Judgment Day as Infant John Connor). He and Linda divorced around 1989. That same year, on the set of the television film Trapped'', Abbott met actress Kathleen Quinlan. They married April 12, 1994 and have one son, Tyler Quinlan (born October 17, 1990).

Filmography

Film

Television

References

Notes

Sources

External links

 

1954 births
20th-century American male actors
21st-century American male actors
American male film actors
American male Shakespearean actors
American male stage actors
American male television actors
David Douglas High School alumni
Living people
Male actors from Portland, Oregon
Portland State University alumni